Stephanie M. Smith (born May 20, 1981) is an American politician who currently serves in the Maryland House of Delegates. Smith represents the 45th Legislative District of the state of Maryland which is located in east Baltimore City.

Background
Smith was born in Virginia Beach, Virginia on May 20, 1981. She attended Hampton University, where she earned a Bachelor of Arts degree in political science in 2003; the University of Delaware, where she earned a Master of Arts degree in urban affairs and public policy in 2006; and the Howard University School of Law, where she earned a Juris Doctor degree in 2009. She was admitted to the Maryland Bar in 2012. After graduating, she served as the assistant director for Equity, Engagement, and Communications for the Baltimore City Department of Planning and worked with various civic organizations in the city. Smith also served as a general counsel for Earthjustice. Smtih is a member of AmeriCorps and the 2017 Emerge Maryland graduating class.

In the legislature
Smith was sworn in as a member of the Maryland House of Delegates on January 9, 2019. In January 2020, she was elected to lead the Baltimore City Delegation, succeeding former chairwoman Cheryl Glenn. In March 2022, Legislative Black Caucus chairman Darryl Barnes appointed Smith to serve as the caucus parliamentarian.

Committee assignments
 Member, Appropriations Committee, 2021–present (education & economic development subcommittee, 2022–present; oversight committee on pensions, 2022–present)
 Member, Ways and Means Committee, 2019–2021 (education subcommittee, 2019–2021; local revenues subcommittee, 2019–2020; racing & gaming subcommittee, 2021)

Other memberships
 Member, Legislative Black Caucus of Maryland, 2019–present
 Member, Maryland Legislative Transit Caucus, 2019–present
 Member, Women Legislators of Maryland, 2019–present
 Member, Maryland Legislative Latino Caucus, 2021–present

Political positions

Education
Smith supports, and voted in favor of passing in 2020, the Blueprint for Maryland's Future. She also supports a vaccine mandate for teachers.

Social issues
During the 2020 legislative session, Smith introduced legislation to ban discrimination based on hair texture. The bill passed and became law on May 8, 2020.

During the 2021 legislative session, Smith introduced legislation to require the state to use federal pandemic relief funding to pay electronic monitoring and home detention fees for select defendants. The bill passed and became law on May 30, 2021.

Taxes
During the 2020 legislative session, Smith introduced legislation to restructure the state's income tax brackets, restoring a higher 7 percent tax bracket for Marylanders with an annual income over $1 million.

Transportation
Smith opposed a proposal to build a Maglev from Baltimore to Washington, D.C.

Electoral history

References

African-American state legislators in Maryland
21st-century American politicians
Democratic Party members of the Maryland House of Delegates
Living people
1981 births
21st-century American women politicians
African-American women in politics
Women state legislators in Maryland
21st-century African-American women
21st-century African-American politicians
20th-century African-American people
20th-century African-American women